The Museum on Miniatures in Prague features a number of miniature works of art, some of them needing to be viewed with a microscope or magnifying device.

See also

 List of museums in Prague
 Prague
 Museums

References

Museums in Prague